Bering is a surname. Notable people with the name surname include:

Vitus Bering (1681–1741), Danish navigator and cartographer, namesake of the Bering Sea and Bering Strait
Vitus Bering (1617–1675), Danish poet and historian
Jesse Bering (born 1975), American psychologist and author
Jonas Bering (born 1975), French musician and songwriter
Myka Bering, fictional character in the TV series Warehouse 13

See also
Bering (disambiguation)
Baring (surname)
Behring (disambiguation)